Port wine cheese is an orange- and red-colored cheese or cheese spread that is heavily dosed with alcoholic port wine as it is made. It is typically used as a cheese spread on foods such as crackers. It can be rolled into a cylindrical shape or into a ball, and is sometimes covered in nuts. Port wine cheese is a mass-produced product in the United States.

See also
 Port Salut cheese
 List of cheeses
 List of spreads
 Pub cheese

References

American cheeses
Port wine